The North America and West Indies Station was a formation or command of the United Kingdom's Royal Navy stationed in North American waters from 1745 to 1956. The North American Station was separate from the Jamaica Station until 1830 when the two combined to form the North America and West Indies Station. It was briefly abolished in 1907 before being restored in 1915. It was renamed the America and West Indies Station in 1926. It was commanded by Commanders-in-Chief whose titles changed with the changing of the formation's name, eventually by the Commander-in-Chief, America and West Indies Station.

History

The squadron was formed in 1745 to counter French forces in North America, with the headquarters at the Halifax Naval Yard in Nova Scotia (now CFB Halifax).

The area of command had first been designated as the North American Station in 1767, under the command of Commodore Samuel Hood, with the headquarters in Halifax from 1758 to 1794, and thereafter in Halifax and Bermuda. Land and buildings for a permanent Naval Yard were purchased by the Royal Navy in 1758 and the Yard was officially commissioned in 1759. The Yard served as the main base for the Royal Navy in North America during the Seven Years' War, the American Revolution, and the French Revolutionary Wars.

Following American independence in 1783, Bermuda was the only British territory left between Nova Scotia and the West Indies (by agreement with the Spanish government, a Royal Navy base was maintained in Florida until this was ceded to the United States), and was selected as the new headquarters for the region. The establishment of a base there was delayed for a dozen years, however, due to the need to survey the encircling barrier reef to locate channels suitable for large warships. Once this had been completed, a base was established at St. George's in 1794, with the fleet anchoring at Murray's Anchorage in the northern lagoon, named for Vice Admiral Sir George Murray, who became the Commander-in-Chief of the new River St. Lawrence and Coast of America and North America and West Indies Station. The Admiralty also began purchasing land at Bermuda's West End, including Ireland Island, Spanish Point, and smaller islands in the Great Sound with the intent of building the Royal Naval Dockyard, Bermuda, and a permanent naval base there, with its anchorage on Grassy Bay. The construction of this base was to drag on through much of the Nineteenth Century.

Admiral Sir John Borlase Warren was appointed Commander-in-Chief in 1812, and he and his staff seem to have spent most of their time at Bermuda during the War of 1812 (he was replaced by Vice Admiral Sir Alexander Inglis Cochrane in 1813), from where the blockade of much of the Atlantic Seaboard of the United States and raids such as the Battle of Craney Island were orchestrated. 2,500 soldiers under Major-General Robert Ross aboard , three frigates, three sloops and ten other vessels, was sent to Bermuda in 1814, following British victory in the Peninsular War, and joined with the naval and military forces already at, or operating from, Bermuda to carry out the Chesapeake campaign, a punitive expedition which included the Raid on Alexandria, the Battle of Bladensburg, and the Burning of Washington was launched in August, 1814.

In 1813, the area of command had become the North America Station again, with the West Indies falling under the Jamaica Station, and in 1816 it was renamed the North America and Lakes of Canada Station. The headquarters was initially in Bermuda during the winter and Halifax during the summer, but Admiralty House, Bermuda, became the year-round headquarters of the Station in 1821, when the area of command became the North America and Newfoundland Station. In 1818 Halifax became the summer base for the squadron which shifted to the Royal Naval Dockyard, Bermuda, for the remainder of the year.

In 1819, the main base of the Station was moved from Halifax to Bermuda, which was better positioned to counter threats from the United States. Halifax continued to be used as the summer base for the station until 1907.

In 1830 the station absorbed the Jamaica Station and was redesignated as the North America and West Indies Station, and remained so until 1907, when the North America and West Indies Station was abolished and its squadron replaced by the 4th Cruiser Squadron. This was based in England and Bermuda was redesignated from a base to a coaling station, although the dockyard remained in operation. The Commander-in-Chief, North America and West Indies Station, remained in Bermuda. The Royal Navy withdrew from Halifax in 1905, and the Halifax Naval Yard was handed over to the Royal Canadian Navy in 1910. The Esquimalt Royal Navy Dockyard on the Pacific coast of Canada was also transferred to the dominion government in 1905.

The North America and West Indies Station was restored in 1915, and incorporated the 8th Cruiser Squadron from 1924–25. Absorbing the areas formerly belonging to the South East Coast of America Station and the Pacific Station, it was redesignated the America and West Indies Station. In 1942 the title of C-in-C America and West Indies was re-styled Senior British Naval Officer, Western Atlantic, subordinating the senior British officer to his United States Navy counterpart as the Allied command in the North Atlantic was divided, with the United States taking command in the West and the United Kingdom in the East. In 1945 the America and West Indies title was restored.

In 1951, the Royal Naval Dockyard, Bermuda, was closed, with the Admiralty Floating Dock No. 5 towed to Britain by HM Tugs Warden and Reward (the smaller AFD 48 remained). The position of Senior Naval Officer West Indies (SNOWI) was established as a Sub-Area Commander under the Commander-in-Chief of the America and West Indies station. The occupant of this position was a commodore, and was provided with a shore office on Ireland Island (which was beside the Victualling Yard until 1962), but was required to spend much of his time at sea in the West Indies. A flagship (between 1951 and April, 1956, this was successively HMS Sheffield, HMS Superb, HMS Sheffield, HMS Kenya) and other vessels of the America and West Indies Squadron continued to be based at the South Yard of the former Royal Naval Dockyard, where the Royal Navy maintained a Berthing Area under the command of a Resident Naval Officer (RNO), but were detached from the Home Fleet, and their refits and repairs were thenceforth to be carried out in Britain. The RNO had his own office in one of the houses of Dockyard Terrace. Admiralty land not required for the continued naval operations was sold to the colonial government. There was also an RNO in Nassau.

In 1952, the Commander-in-Chief, Vice Admiral Sir William Andrewes, became the initial Deputy Supreme Allied Commander Atlantic.

For ships stationed in Canada and North America, go to List of Royal Navy ships in North America.

Disestablishment and successor, SNOWI
On 29 October 1956, the post of Commander-in-Chief, America and West Indies Station, was abolished, leaving the Senior Naval Officer, West Indies as his replacement. SNOWI reported directly to the Commander-in-Chief, Home Fleet, flying his flag back in the United Kingdom. SNOWI also served as Island Commander Bermuda (ISCOMBERMUDA) in the NATO chain of command, reporting to Commander-in-Chief, Western Atlantic Area, as part of SACLANT. The ships of the command were reduced to two Station Frigates.

All remaining Admiralty land, including Admiralty House at Clarence Hill and Ireland Island, along with and War Department lands, were sold to the colonial government between 1957 and 1965. In December, 1967, the position of RNO Bermuda was abolished, with its duties passing to SNOWI's secretary and SNOWI taking over command of HMS Malabar. As SNOWI was frequently in the West Indies, he was unable to effectively command HMS Malabar and a Lieutenant-Commander was consequently appointed to the roles of Commanding Officer of HMS Malabar and RNO in 1971.

The former Royal Naval wireless station land at Daniels Head was leased to the Royal Canadian Navy on 1 January 1963, for the purpose of a new radio station. It became CFS Daniel's Head when the Royal Canadian Navy became part of the Canadian Forces in 1969.

After the assassination of the Governor of Bermuda, Sir Richard Sharples, in February 1973,  provided enhanced security for Commodore Cameron Rusby, the then-SNOWI. A detachment of Royal Marines (subsequently replaced by soldiers from the Parachute Regiment) was posted to the Dockyard to guard SNOWI.

While Bermuda had been the ideal base of operations for the North America and West Indies Station, at a thousand miles north of the Virgin Islands, it was far too distant to serve as an effective headquarters for only the West Indies. This meant that both SNOWI and the Station Frigates spent little time in or near Bermuda. On 1 April 1976, the post of SNOWI was abolished, and the Station Frigates were withdrawn. The RNO and his staff remained, and a frigate was appointed West Indies Guardship, but seldom visited Bermuda. HMS Malabar ceased to be a base and was rated only as a supply station.

By 1995, when Malabar was handed over to the Government of Bermuda, the Royal Naval presence in the North-Western Atlantic and Caribbean had been reduced to only the West Indies Guard Ship, a role which was rotated among the fleet's escorts, which took turns operating extended patrols of the West Indies.

Years after the disestablishment of the SNOWI post, the West Indies Guard Ship task was redesignated Atlantic Patrol Task (North).

Sub commands
 Jamaica Division consisting of naval vessels
 Jamaica Dockyard shore establishment.

Commanders in Chief

Commanders of the station have included:
 = died in post

Commander-in-Chief, North American Station
 Commodore James Douglas (1746–48) - appointed Commodore of Newfoundland at this time.
 Commodore Charles Watson (1748–49)
 Commodore Augustus Keppel (1751–55)
 Commodore Lord Colville (November 1759 – October 1762)    
 Commodore Richard Spry (October 1762 – October 1763)    
 Rear Admiral Lord Colville (October 1763 – September 1766)    
 Captain Joseph Deane, September 1766 – November 1766  (senior captain)        
 Captain Archibald Kennedy, November 1766 – July 1767 (senior captain)    
 Commodore Samuel Hood  (July 1767 – October 1770)
 Commodore James Gambier  (October 1770 – August 1771)    
 Rear Admiral John Montagu (August 1771 – June 1774)    
 Vice Admiral Samuel Graves (June 1774 – January 1776)
 Vice Admiral Richard Howe (February 1776 – September 1778)
 Vice Admiral James Gambier (1778–79)
 Vice Admiral John Byron (1779)
 Vice Admiral Mariot Arbuthnot (1779–81)
 Vice Admiral Sir Thomas Graves (1781)
 Rear Admiral Robert Digby (1781–83)
 Rear Admiral Sir Charles Douglas (1783–85)
 Vice Admiral Sir Herbert Sawyer (1785–89)
 Vice Admiral Sir Richard Hughes (1789–92)
 Captain Sir Rupert George (1792-1794)
 Vice Admiral George Murray (1794–96)
 Vice Admiral George Vandeput (1797–1800) 
 Vice Admiral Sir William Parker (1800–02)
 Vice Admiral Sir Andrew Mitchell (1802–06) 
 Vice Admiral Sir George Cranfield Berkeley (1806–07)
 Vice Admiral Sir John Warren (1807–10)
 Vice Admiral Sir Herbert Sawyer (1810–13)
 Admiral Sir John Warren (1813–14)
 Vice Admiral Sir Alexander Cochrane (1814–15)
 Vice Admiral Sir David Milne (1816)
 Vice Admiral Sir Edward Colpoys (1816–21)

Commander-in-Chief, North America and West Indies Station
 Vice Admiral Sir William Fahie (1821–24)
 Vice Admiral Sir Willoughby Lake (1824–27)
 Vice Admiral Sir Charles Ogle (1827–30)
 Vice Admiral Sir Edward Colpoys (1830–32)
 Vice Admiral Sir George Cockburn (1832–36)
 Vice Admiral Sir Peter Halkett (1836–37)
 Vice Admiral Sir Charles Paget (1837–39) 
 Commodore Peter John Douglas (1839)
 Vice Admiral Sir Thomas Harvey (1839–41) 
 Commodore Peter John Douglas (1841)
 Vice Admiral Sir Charles Adam (1841–44)
 Vice Admiral Sir Francis Austen (1844–48)
 Vice Admiral Sir Thomas Cochrane (1848–51)
 Vice Admiral Sir George Seymour (1851–53)
 Vice Admiral Sir Arthur Fanshawe (1853–56)
 Vice Admiral Sir Houston Stewart (1856–60)
 Vice Admiral Sir Alexander Milne (1860–64)
 Vice Admiral Sir James Hope (1864–67)
 Vice Admiral Sir Rodney Mundy (1867–69)
 Vice Admiral Sir George Wellesley (1869–70)
 Vice Admiral Sir Edward Fanshawe (1870–73)
 Vice Admiral Sir George Wellesley (1873–75)
 Vice Admiral Sir Astley Key (1875–78)
 Vice Admiral Sir Edward Inglefield (1878–79)
 Vice Admiral Sir Francis McClintock (1879–82)
 Vice Admiral Sir John Commerell (1882–85)
 Vice Admiral The Earl of Clanwilliam (1885–86)
 Vice Admiral Sir Algernon Lyons (1886–88)
 Vice Admiral Sir George Watson (1888–91)
 Vice Admiral Sir John Hopkins (1891–95)
 Vice Admiral Sir James Erskine (1895–97)
 Vice Admiral Sir Jackie Fisher (1897–99)
 Vice Admiral Sir Frederick Bedford (1899–15 July 1902)
 Vice Admiral Sir Archibald Douglas (15 July 1902 – 1904)
 Vice Admiral Sir Day Bosanquet (1904–07)
Vacant (1907–13)
 Vice Admiral Sir Christopher Cradock (1913–14) 
 Rear Admiral Robert Hornby (1914–15)
 Vice Admiral Sir George Patey (1915–16)
 Vice Admiral Sir Montague Browning (1916–18)
 Vice Admiral Sir William Grant (1918–19)
 Vice Admiral Sir Morgan Singer (1919)
 Vice Admiral Sir Trevylyan Napier (1919–20) 
 Vice Admiral Sir William Pakenham (1920–23)
 Vice Admiral Sir Michael Culme-Seymour (1923–24)
 Vice Admiral Sir James Fergusson (1924–26)

Commander-in-Chief, America and West Indies Station
 Vice Admiral Sir Walter Cowan (1926–28)
 Vice Admiral Sir Cyril Fuller (1928–30)
 Vice Admiral Sir Vernon Haggard (1930–32)
 Vice Admiral Sir Reginald Plunkett (1932–34)
 Vice Admiral Sir Matthew Best (1934–37)
 Vice Admiral Sir Sidney Meyrick (1937–40)
 Vice Admiral Sir Charles Kennedy-Purvis (1940–41)

Senior British Naval Officer, Western Atlantic
 Vice Admiral Sir Charles Kennedy-Purvis (1942)
 Vice Admiral Sir Alban Curteis (1942–44)
 Vice Admiral Sir Irvine Glennie (1944–45)

Commander-in-Chief, America and West Indies Station
After the end of the Second World War the former name of the station was restored.

 Vice Admiral Sir William Tennant (1946–49)
 Vice Admiral Sir Richard Symonds-Tayler (1949–51)
 Vice Admiral Sir William Andrewes (1951–53)
 Vice Admiral Sir John Stevens (1953–55)
 Vice Admiral Sir John Eaton (1955–56)

See also
 List of fleets and major commands of the Royal Navy
 Military history of Nova Scotia
 Military history of Canada
 Commander-in-Chief, North America
 Imperial fortress

References

Sources

External links
 Leo Niehorster, Station as at 3 September 1939

Commands of the Royal Navy
Military of Bermuda
Military history of Nova Scotia
Military history of the Atlantic Ocean
Military units and formations disestablished in 1956
Military units and formations of the Royal Navy in World War II